Tanja Miščević (born 6 August 1966) is a Serbian political scientist and politician serving as minister of European Integration since 2022. An independent politician, she is best known for her work on the accession of Serbia to the European Union.

Born in Zemun, a Belgrade municipality, she graduated and earned her master's and doctorate at the Faculty of Political Sciences at the University of Belgrade. She began working at the Faculty of Political Sciences in the 1990s, becoming a docent in 2003 and an associate professor in 2009. As of 2016, she serves as a professor at the Faculty of Political Sciences. She was the director of the Office for European Integration from 2005 to 2009; member of government's negotiating team regarding accession of Serbia to the European Union and head of the negotiating team for the Visa Facilitation Agreement and Readmission Agreement between Serbia and the European Union. She also previously served as vice-president of the European Movement in Serbia, and as a member and vice-president of the board of the Anti-Corruption Agency.

She served as the state secretary in the ministry of defence from 2010 to 2012, and was appointed director of the negotiating team regarding the accession of Serbia to the European Union in 2013. As the director, she emphasised on harmonising Serbia's foreign policy positions with the European Union and worked on implementing the reforms into law. She resigned from the role in 2019, after which she began working as deputy secretary general of Regional Cooperation Council.

Early life 
Tanja Miščević was born on 6 August 1966 in Zemun, Belgrade, Socialist Republic of Serbia, Socialist Federal Republic of Yugoslavia. She finished her primary and secondary education in Zemun. She graduated from the Faculty of Political Sciences at the University of Belgrade in 1989, where she also earned her master's and doctorate. She specialised in the field of the European Union at the University of Bonn in 1988 and the College of Europe in 2004.

Career

Faculty of Political Sciences 
Miščević began her work at the Faculty of Political Sciences at the University of Belgrade in 1991 as a demonstrator for the English language, a role which she held until 1995, when she became an intern assistant. She worked as an assistant until 2003, when she became a docent. In 2009, she became an associate professor at the faculty, where she studied international and legal fields. She became a professor in 2016. Additionally, she was a visiting professor at the Military Academy of the Ministry of Defense and the Centre for European Integration at the University of Bonn.

European Integrations 

She was one of the founding members of the G17 Institute, a non-governmental organisation later-turned political party, where she worked as a manager for the department of European studies. Between 2005 and 2009, she was the director of the Office for European Integration of the government of Serbia. Miščević won the "Contributor of the Year to Europe" award in 2006. She was a member of government's negotiating team regarding the accession of Serbia to the European Union as well as the head of negotiating team for the conclusion of the Visa Facilitation Agreement and the Readmission Agreement between Serbia and the European Union. Miščević was appointed state secretary in the ministry of defence by Dragan Šutanovac in 2010; she served in that role until July 2012, after which she served as a special secretary for European Integrations for Rasim Ljajić, who at the time served as deputy prime minister. Aleksandar Vučić suggested the appointment of Miščević as the director of the negotiating team regarding the accession of Serbia to the European Union in 2013. She accepted the job shortly after in September 2013. As the director, she urged to implement the reforms into law, to enter the European Union as soon as possible. She also emphasised her support to harmonise Serbia's foreign policy positions with the positions of the European Union. She received the "Rainbow" award from the Gay Straight Alliance due to her contribution for the fight against homophobia and improving rights of the LGBT population. She resigned from the role in September 2019. She soon after became the deputy secretary general of Regional Cooperation Council.

She previously served as vice-president of European Movement in Serbia. Additionally, Miščević served as a member and vice-president of the board of the Anti-Corruption Agency from 2009 to 2010. According to newspaper Danas, Miščević is reputed to be an expert on European Integration of Serbia.

Minister of European Integration 
It was announced on 23 October 2022 that Miščević would serve as the minister of European Integration in the third cabinet of Ana Brnabić. She was sworn in on 26 October. Miščević advocates for the accession of Serbia to the European Union, citing her support for a "modern, stable, and developed society" and equality.

In November 2022, Miščević announced that "Serbia will progressively adopt the visa policy of the Schengen Area" and that it will align its foreign and security policy with the European Union.

Personal life 
Miščević received the French National Order of Merit in 2017 due to her work on accession of Serbia to the European Union. She speaks English and Russian.

Published works

References 

1966 births
Living people
University of Belgrade Faculty of Political Science alumni
University of Belgrade people
Independent politicians in Serbia
21st-century Serbian politicians
21st-century Serbian women politicians
Women government ministers of Serbia
Politicians from Belgrade
Serbian political scientists
Recipients of the Ordre national du Mérite